Pongu (Pangu), or Rin, is a Kainji language spoken in Nigeria. There are about 20,000 speakers. Their main centre is in Pangu Gari town of Niger State, about 20 kilometres southeast of Tegina. In Niger state, Rafi local government Kagara

Clans
There are 8 Rin clans. They speak slightly different but mutually comprehensible dialects.

Ca-su
Ca-undu
A-sebi
Ca-gere = Ca-majere
A-baba = U-bwɔbwɔ
A-wusi = A-kwa
A-zhiga
A-waga = Awәgә

The Awәgә may have been a different ethnic group that was assimilated into the Rin group. Awәgә was a distinct language related to Rin, and used to be spoken in some villages to the east of Zungeru. However, today it is nearly extinct. Blench (2012) was able to record a semi-speaker in Dikko village, near Luwa town, Rafi LGA. Two fluent speakers were reported in Gidan Gambo, near Pongu Gari.

Bibliography
Dettweiler, Stephen and Sonia Dettweiler (2002) 'Sociolinguistic survey of the Pongu people', SIL Electronic Survey Reports 2002-040

References

Further reading
Sociolinguistic survey of the Pongu people

Shiroro languages
Languages of Nigeria